The WhosYourDriver.org Twin 100s is a dual NASCAR K&N Pro Series race held annually at South Boston Speedway. From 2007 to 2011, the race was held as a 150-lap race. After a hiatus from 2012 to 2016, the event returned in 2017 in its current Twin 100 format.

Past winners 

 2008 and 2019: Race extended due to overtime.
 2019: Twin 100 No. 2 was postponed halfway through from May 4 to May 5.

References

External links 
http://www.racing-reference.info/race/2017-05/E
 

2017 in NASCAR
ARCA Menards Series East
NASCAR races at South Boston Speedway